A Holy Terror is a 1931 American pre-Code Western movie starring George O'Brien, Sally Eilers, Rita La Roy, and Humphrey Bogart. The film is an adaptation by Ralph Block, Alfred A. Cohn, and Myron C. Fagan of the novel Trailin'! by Max Brand. It was directed by Irving Cummings.

Plot
Polo player Tony Bard travels West to investigate his father's murder, and meets Jerry Foster on a Wyoming ranch. After being kidnapped, Tony escapes and discovers his true father and learns that he was raised by another man, who was in love with his mother.

Cast
 George O'Brien as Tony Bard aka "Woodbury"
 Sally Eilers as Jerry Foster
 Rita La Roy as Kitty Carroll
 Humphrey Bogart as Steve Nash
 James Kirkwood as William Drew
 Stanley Fields as Butch Morgan
 Robert Warwick as John Bard aka "Thomas Woodbury"
 Richard Tucker as Tom Hedges
 Earl Pingree as Jim Lawler, Ranch Manager
 Ralph Bucko as Wrangler (uncredited)
 George Chandler as Joe, Western Union Clerk (uncredited)
 Wong Chung as Cook (uncredited)
 John Elliott as Sheriff (uncredited)
 Bud Geary as Tony's Chauffeur (uncredited)
 Otto Han as Houseboy (uncredited)
 Walter Hiers as Traveling Salesman (uncredited)
 Fred Kohler, Jr. as Party Guest (uncredited)
 Jerry Mandy as Louie, the Barber (uncredited)
 Franklin Parker as Hotel Clerk (uncredited)
 Julian Rivero as Woodbury's Butler (uncredited)
 Oscar Smith as Stuttering Servant (uncredited)
 Slim Whitaker as Johnson (uncredited)
 Jay Wilsey as Cowboy (uncredited)

References

External links
 
 
 MaxBrandOnline.com
 dvd of the film

1931 films
1931 Western (genre) films
1930s English-language films
American black-and-white films
American Western (genre) films
Films directed by Irving Cummings
Fox Film films
Films based on American novels
1930s American films